Mohanmala Maladev Gohain, Barjana Gohain or simply know as Mohanmala Gohain, was the third son of great Rudra Singha. He held the rank of Namrup Raja, he was the lawful third heir to the throne after Pramatta Singha according to his father's wish.

Denial to the throne 
He had an attack of smallpox, but it was Keertichandra Borbarua, grown as very prominent figure. The rising power denied the claims of Mohanmala Gohaindeo to the throne and gave it away to his younger brother Rajeswar Singha. On his advice, he was exiled to Namrup.

Rebellion 
After the death of Rajeswar Singha, was succeeded by Lakshmi Singha he was sat on the throne by the help Keertichandra Borbarua, which was not a favourable choice. The dissatisfied Moamoria's  rebelled against the monarch. Mohanmala Gohaindeo along with Maju Gohain and Saru Gohain( exiled sons of Rajeswar Singha) by Lakshmi Singha. The exiled royals befriended with the rebels and promised to make them king when needed. Little did they know they came from low quarters. Batgharia Mohanmala Gohain was made the chief of the rebels. With the rebels they fought with the Senapati phukan, destroyed the fort and captured the phukan. When the news reached to Swargodeo, he expressed his sorrow.

Betrayal and treachery 
During the first stage of the rebellion the Morans had declared Ihe handsome and popular prince Mohanmala Gohain, the third son  King Rudra Singha, as Raja. This prince had been deprived of his lawful succession to the throne through the madiinations of Kirtichandra Barbarua. By this means the rebels avoided popular opposition. Many of the royalist soldiers left the field, and tho villagers offered submission to the champions of Mohanmala’s cause. After occupying the capital the Morans, however, conferred the Rajaship and other important offices on their own men. Mohan- mala was poisoned as well as several other princes who had joino the rebels in hopes of preferment. After the fighting the morans captured the capital, the rebels secretly poisoned Saru-Gohain and Maju-Gohain.

References 
Sk Bhuyan, Tungkhungia Buranji,
Ea Gait, A History of Assam

Ahom kingdom

1780s deaths

Year of birth unknown

Year of death uncertain